Teignmouth railway station is on the Exeter to Plymouth line and serves the town of Teignmouth in Devon, England. It is operated by Great Western Railway and is the second-busiest station on the Riviera Line after .

History

The station was opened by the South Devon Railway Company on 30 May 1846 as the terminus of its first section from Exeter. The single platform was augmented by a second one late in 1848. At this time it was a  broad gauge railway.

Teignmouth was the original headquarters of the South Devon Railway, the station and offices being described as a "primitive apology for a station" and locally dubbed the 'Noah's Ark'.

Trains were worked from Exeter by atmospheric power from 13 September 1847 and these were extended to Newton Abbot from 17 December 1847 until all the atmospheric trains were suspended on 9 September 1848. The atmospheric engine house was situated adjacent to the platform on the side furthest from the town, the area then being used as permanent way workshops until about 1876.

The South Devon Railway was amalgamated into the Great Western Railway on 1 February 1876.  When first built the station was situated between two tunnels but the West Tunnel was opened out by June 1881 and the Eastcliffe Tunnel leading to the Sea Wall was removed by 1884, when the distinctive lattice girder bridge at the end of the Sea Wall was installed.

On 20 May 1892 the line was converted to  standard gauge. The station was completely rebuilt soon after, the work being completed early in 1895. To accommodate longer trains the westbound platform was extended in 1938 and could then handle 15 coach trains, but the opposite platform could not be extended due to the entrance to the goods yard.

The Great Western Railway in turn was nationalised into British Railways on 1 January 1948. General goods traffic at Teignmouth ceased on 14 June 1965 but coal traffic continued to be handled until 4 December 1967.  This allowed the extension of the second platform to the length of Inter City trains, although this did not happen until 1981.  The signal box, which was built at the west end of the westbound platform in 1896, was closed on 14 November 1986 when the new Panel Signal Box at Exeter took over control of the line.

The station was closed for two months during the repair of the railway and sea wall at Dawlish caused by the great storm of February 2014. The iron work supporting the roof was repainted during this period. Refurbishing of the pedestrian bridge between the platforms commenced in 2016.

Description
The station is situated near the edge of the town centre, a short walk from the beach and South West Coast Path.

The main entrance and booking office are on the westbound platform; all of the main facilities, including a café, are situated here. When the booking office is closed, access to the station is through the gates adjacent to the wide footbridge which links the two platforms.

Services

Teignmouth is served by Great Western Railway's local trains in both directions on an approximately half-hourly basis during the day.

A few Great Western Railway trains from /Cardiff or from London Paddington also call at Teignmouth (there are 4 to 5 direct London trains per day), as do some CrossCountry services from the North of England. At other times, passengers travelling east or north can catch a local train and change onto main line trains at Exeter St Davids or at Newton Abbot if travelling westwards. 

Journey times between Teignmouth and Exeter take between about 16 and 30 minutes; journeys to London Paddington are usually between 2h 30m and 3h.

References

Further reading

Railway stations in Devon
Railway stations in Great Britain opened in 1846
Former Great Western Railway stations
Railway stations served by CrossCountry
Railway stations served by Great Western Railway
Teignmouth
DfT Category D stations